John Buchanan may refer to:

Business
John Buchanan (oil executive) (1943–2015), New Zealand-born scientist and director
John C. Buchanan (businessman) (fl. 1846–1848), businessman in San Francisco
John Murdoch Buchanan (1897–1975), businessman and Chancellor of the University of British Columbia

Military
John Buchanan (frontiersman)(1759–1832), American settler and founder of Buchanan's Station

Politics and law
John Buchanan (Canadian politician) (1931–2019), Premier of Nova Scotia, 1978–1990.
John Buchanan (American politician), American journalist and U.S. presidential candidate, 2004
John Buchanan (Maryland judge) (1772–1844), Chief Judge of the Maryland Court of Appeals
John Buchanan (MP) (1761–1839), Scottish politician, MP for Dunbartonshire 1821–26
John Buchanan (New Zealand politician) (1819–1892), New Zealand politician
John A. Buchanan (1843–1921), US House of Representatives member from Virginia
John Alexander Buchanan (1887–1976), Canadian senator
John Andrew Buchanan (1863–1935), judge and politician in Astoria in the U.S. state of Oregon
John C. Buchanan (Texas politician), Texas state senator, 1879–1885, see Eighteenth Texas Legislature
John C. Buchanan (Virginia politician), Virginia state senator, 1972–1991
John Hall Buchanan Jr. (1928–2018), US House of Representatives member from Alabama
John P. Buchanan (1847–1930), Governor of Tennessee
John Preston Buchanan (1888–1937), American politician in the Virginia Senate
J. W. Buchanan (1871–1941), Arizona politician, state senator, state house of representatives

Religion
John Buchanan (pastor), pastor of the Fourth Presbyterian Church of Chicago
John Buchanan (bishop) (1933–2020), American bishop of the Episcopal Church

Sciences and medicine
John Buchanan (biologist) (1917–2007), professor of biochemistry at the Massachusetts Institute of Technology
John Buchanan (botanist) (1819–1898), New Zealand botanist and scientific artist
John Young Buchanan (1844–1925), Scottish chemist, oceanographer and Arctic explorer

Sports
John Buchanan (English cricketer) (1887–1969), English cricketer and decorated WWI officer
John Buchanan (Australian cricketer) (born 1953), Australian cricketer and coach
John Buchanan (Cambuslang footballer) (fl. 1889), Scottish footballer
John Buchanan (footballer, born 1899) (1899–1947), Scottish footballer (St Mirren, Rangers, Morton)
John Buchanan (footballer, born 1928) (1928–2000), Scottish footballer (Clyde)
John Buchanan (footballer, born 1935) (1935–2009), Scottish footballer (Hibernian)
John Buchanan (footballer, born 1951), Scottish footballer (Cardiff City, Northampton Town)
John Buchanan (sailor) (1884–1943), British Olympic gold medalist in 1908
John Buchanan (soccer), former Canadian soccer coach, in the Canadian Soccer Hall of Fame

Other fields
John Buchanan (inventor), Australian inventor of the atmospheric diving suit
John Buchanan (judoka) (born 1975), British judoka
John Buchanan (horticulturalist) (1855–1896), Scottish agriculturalist and early colonial settler in Nyasland
John Buchanan (Virginia colonist) (died 1769) Virginia landowner, magistrate and soldier
John Lee Buchanan (1831–1922), second president of Virginia Tech (then Virginia Agricultural and Mechanical College)

See also
James Buchanan (1791–1868), US President commonly misreferenced as "John"